A Coach for Cinderella is a 1936 Technicolor animated cartoon sponsored film based on the Cinderella fairy tale.  Directed by Max Fleischer for Jaminson Handy, the film is an advertisement for Chevrolet automobiles.

Summary
The story begins with Cinderella wishing to have a better life, away from her evil stepsisters. There is a gnome that is watching Cinderella live a strenuous life. When Cinderella falls asleep the gnome takes Cinderella's measurements, then leaves to meet other gnomes in the woods. He tells them that Cinderella has done quite a bit for them when they were in need, so they should return the favor. The gnomes decide to help Cinderella by making her a dress for the ball, and a car that she can travel in.  They use various things around the forest to make her a carriage. Then, they put it through the "modernizer" and at the end of the clip it is revealed to be a new Chevrolet.  Cinderella then goes out to the ball in the car, with the rest of the story told by the sequel A Ride for Cinderella. This film is in the public domain.

See also
Chevrolet
Jam Handy
Fairy tales
Advertising
Sponsored film
A Ride for Cinderella
Peg-Leg Pedro
The Princess and the Pauper

External links
 
 
 Vimeo

References

1936 films
Film advertising material
1930s animated short films
Chevrolet
Films based on Cinderella
Sponsored films
1930s American animated films
American animated short films
1936 animated films
Jam Handy Organization films
Promotional films